Our Lady of Lourdes High School is an American private Roman Catholic school, located in Poughkeepsie, New York, in Dutchess County.

The school received accreditation from the Middle States Association of Colleges and Schools in May 2004. 

In 2009, the school separated itself from the Roman Catholic Archdiocese of New York.

History

The school was founded in April 1958 by Francis Cardinal Spellman, who purchased the former Poughkeepsie High School building and grounds from the  Poughkeepsie Board of Education. 

The school was given its name in honor of the centenary of the apparition of the Virgin Mary at Lourdes in France.

The new school opened in September 1958 with a faculty of four brothers and four sisters, and an athletic coach.  The original school was divided into two halves, one for the boys and one for the girls. Opening enrollment was 280 students. The boys' school opened with four classes of 35 students each, as did the girls' school. Our Lady of Lourdes existed this way as separate schools until 1967.

The campus moved to a suburban location on Boardman Road in the Town of Poughkeepsie starting in the 1996–1997 school year at the location of the former IBM Homestead.

The school was led by Father John Lagiovane from 2007 to 2014. The 2014–2015 school year began under the leadership of the new principal, Catherine Merryman, in September 2014.

Interscholastic sports
Our Lady of Lourdes is a member of the New York State Public High School Athletic Association.

Fall
Boys' cross country
Girls' cross country
Field hockey
Football
Boys' soccer
Girls' soccer
Girls' tennis
Cheerleading
Girls' volleyball
Girls' swimming

Winter
Boys' basketball
Girls' basketball
Boys' swimming
Cheerleading
Winter track
Boys' bowling
Girls' bowling
Boys' fencing
Girls' fencing
Wrestling

Spring
Baseball –  
Crew
Golf
Softball
Boys' tennis
Outdoor track

Notable alumni

 Ed Bastian (class of 1975) –  CEO, Delta Air Lines
 Kelly Cass (class of 1985) – meteorologist
 Bill C. Davis (class of 1969) – playwright; author, Mass Appeal
 Brian Hogan (class of 1991) – Deputy Chief of Police, Albany New York
 Joseph Mazzello (class of 2001) – actor
 Carter Page (class of 1989) – former foreign policy adviser to the Donald Trump 2016 presidential campaign
 Barbara Rhoades (class of 1964) – actress
 Patrick Whearty (class of 1998) – professional basketball player 
 Maddy Siegrist (class of 2018)-  She broke the Big East and Villanova’s single-game scoring record with 50pts. She also became the Big East's all-time leading scorer.

References

External links
 , the school's official website

1958 establishments in New York (state)
Catholic secondary schools in New York (state)
Education in Poughkeepsie, New York
Educational institutions established in 1958
Marist Brothers schools
Private high schools in Dutchess County, New York